Wish Me Luck is a 2001 Turkish action film directed by Çağan Irmak.

Cast
Mert Akça
Nilgün Belgün
Başak Dasman
Remzi Evren
İsmail Hacıoğlu
Rıza Kocaoğlu
Kutay Köktürk
Aysun Metiner
Güler Ökten
Fuat Onan
Oya Semerci
Volkan Severcan
Melisa Sözen
Levent Sülün as Komiser Hasan
Deniz Ugur
Berke Üzrek

External links 

2001 films
2000s Turkish-language films
2001 action films
Films set in Turkey
Turkish action thriller films
Turkish teen films
Films directed by Çağan Irmak